Punjab Kesari is a Hindi-language newspaper published from many centres in Punjab, Haryana, Rajasthan, Himachal Pradesh and Delhi in India. It is owned by the Punjab Kesari group (The Hindsamachar Ltd.). It is one of the four newspapers started by the group; the other three are Hind Samachar in Urdu, Jagbani in Punjabi languages and Navodaya Times in Hindi languages from Delhi NCR.

The newspaper was established by Lala Jagat Narain and later on his elder son Romesh Chander took over the reins. However, during the days of terrorism in Punjab, both were assassinated, in 1981 and 1984 respectively. The management also established Shaheed Parivar Fund (martyrs' welfare fund) to provide help to the affected families.

Publication centres 

The newspaper has a daily circulation of approximate  copies which are printed from the following locations: 

 Jalandhar (since 1965) 
 Delhi (1983) 
 Ambala Cantt (1991)
 Palampur (2004)
 Ludhiana (2004)
 Jaipur (2006)
 Panipat (2006)
 Hisar (2006)
 Jammu (2007)
 Mohali (2008), 
 Chandigarh (2009)
 Shimla (2009)

Punjab Kesari on internet 
Digital Portals: publish news on their respective websites from two different places in India, i.e., Delhi on PunjabKesari.com and Jalandhar on PunjabKesari.in. As per Alexa, a web traffic data and analytics, Jalandhar group's website PunjabKesari.in is ranked 523 in India and Delhi group's website PunjabKesari.com is ranked 9425 in India on 17 March 2018.

Bollywood Kesari: Delhi group launched a Bollywood niche website under the brand name Bollywood Kesari. 

Cricket Kesari: Delhi group launched a Cricket niche website recently under the brand name Cricket Kesari and Its Facebook page has over 121k likes. sports punjab kesari site is: sports.punjabkesari.in

Shayari: Delhi group also launched a Shayari specific Facebook page named Shayari

Prominent columnists 

 Khushwant Singh
 Shekhar Gurera  
 Feroze Varun Gandhi
 Poonam I Kaushik 
 Shanta Kumar
 Vineet Narain
 Virendra Kapur 
 B G Verghese 
 Balbir Punj
 Mahmood Shaam
 Karan Thapar
 Kalyani Shankar 
 Manmohan Sharma
 Neera Chopra
 Maneka Gandhi
 Chandermohan
 Chander Trikha
 Nerja Chaudhry

Gallery

References 

Hindi-language newspapers
Daily newspapers published in India
Mass media in Haryana
Mass media in Punjab, India
1965 establishments in Delhi
Publications established in 1965